Kuturgan is a village in Osh Region of Kyrgyzstan. It is part of the Özgön District. Its population was 1,856 in 2021.

References

Populated places in Osh Region